Ophiocoma erinaceus is a species of echinoderms belonging to the family Ophiocomidae.

The species is found in Indian and Pacific Ocean.

References

Ophiocomidae